René Kiener (born May 21, 1938) is a former Swiss professional ice hockey goaltender who represented the Swiss national team at the 1964 Winter Olympics.

References

External links
 Rene Kiener statistics at Sports-Reference.com

1938 births
Living people
Ice hockey people from Bern
SC Bern players
Ice hockey players at the 1964 Winter Olympics
Olympic ice hockey players of Switzerland
Swiss ice hockey goaltenders